Cigala is a surname. Notable people with this surname include:

 Giovanni Cigala (1622–1687), Greek Cypriot academician and philosopher
 Lanfranc Cigala (or Cicala) (fl. 1235–1257), Genoese nobleman, knight, judge, and man of letters
 Giovanni Cigala (1805–1857), harpsichordist and choir master of the theater in Zadar

See also
Diego el Cigala (born 1968), a Romani Flamenco gypsy singer